The Old Boys Network was the first international Cyberfeminist alliance. It was founded in 1997 in Berlin and remained active until 2001.

The group was founded by Susanne Ackers, Julianne Pierce, Valentina Djordjevic, Ellen Nonnenmacher and Cornelia Sollfrank in the spring of 1997. They organised the First Cyberfeminist International in September of that year as part of the Documenta X art event. The twentieth anniversary of the First Cyberfeminist International was marked by the Institute of Contemporary Art, London with a five-day event called the Post-Cyber Feminist International.

References

Digital artists
International artist groups and collectives
Feminist art organizations